Allen J. MacDonald (March 15, 1896 – Unknown) was an American football halfback who played for the Duluth Kelleys of the National Football League (NFL). He played in between 6 and 7 games.

References

1896 births
Year of death missing
Duluth Eskimos players
American football halfbacks
Players of American football from Minnesota